Seth Rose is an American lawyer and politician. Prior to his legal and political career, Rose was a First Team All-America singles tennis player for the University of South Carolina. In his college career Rose twice defeated the number one ranked NCAA singles player in the nation and advanced to the Round of 16 in the 2003 Div. I NCAA Men’s Singles Championships held in Athens, Georgia. He was inducted into the Gamecock Athletic Hall of Fame in 2014. A former Richland County Councilman (2011-2018), he is currently a member of the South Carolina House of Representatives from the 72nd District, serving since 2018. He is a member of the Democratic party. Rose is a former Richland County prosecutor and the principal attorney at Seth Rose, Attorney at Law.

As a Councilman he is credited with instituting roll call voting and the broadcasting of Council meetings over the internet/cable television. Councilman Rose was also responsible for: stopping unwanted rock quarries along Bluff Road near Williams-Brice Stadium and the Arthurtown neighborhood; closing adult businesses (in Council District 5) operating for decades in violation of county zoning laws; playing an integral part in the redevelopment of the Rosewood Curtiss Wright Hangar; stopping the practice of private websites putting all Richland County mugshots of accused citizens online and charging money for their removal; expanding library services across downtown Columbia and St. Andrews (including the return of the Edgewood Library branch to the community after being closed for forty years); and voting against financially wasteful budget items.

Rose is also known for his exemplary constituent service and was recognized by Keep the Midlands Beautiful for being the "Green Elected Official of the Year," becoming the first-ever local elected official to win the award.

Representative Rose currently serves on the House Judiciary committee and the Operations and Management committee. Rose also serves on the Joint Legislative Committee to Screen Candidates for College and University Boards of Trustees. As a Freshman Legislator Rose had more bills signed into law than any other Legislator after having three bills he authored become law. Rose has also secured millions in road improvements in the District he represents including pedestrian safety enhancements on Millwood Avenue  and a transformative five million dollar project in Five Points slated to begin in 2024.

Personal life 
Rose is married to Anna Cartin, they have three children, Cole, Luke and Matilda “Tillie”.

References

Living people
1980 births
Democratic Party members of the South Carolina House of Representatives
21st-century American politicians
University of South Carolina alumni